Seppo Suhonen (born 26 April 1967) is a Finnish biathlete. He competed in the men's 20 km individual event at the 1992 Winter Olympics.

References

External links
 

1967 births
Living people
Finnish male biathletes
Olympic biathletes of Finland
Biathletes at the 1992 Winter Olympics
People from Lieksa
Sportspeople from North Karelia